Lin Yun (born April 16, 1996), also known by her English name Jelly Lin, is a Chinese actress. She is known for her role as the female lead in the 2016 film The Mermaid.

Biography
Lin was born Fei Xia in Huzhou, Zhejiang, on April 16, 1996. Her father, Fei Jianhua, is a porter, and her mother is a housewife. She studied at the Huzhou No. 12 Middle School, and then attended a performing arts school in Beijing.

Career
At the age of 18 and with little acting experience, Lin was cast as the female protagonist in the 2016 film The Mermaid directed by Stephen Chow. The Mermaid was the highest-grossing film in China and launched Lin to fame. The same year, Lin featured in the fantasy epic film  L.O.R.D: Legend of Ravaging Dynasties, directed and written by Guo Jingming.

Lin starred in another Stephen Chow film, Journey to the West: Conquering the Demons 2 (2017) where she played the White Bone Spirit. She was also cast in the Disney-made romantic comedy The Dreaming Man, as well as historical epic Genghis Khan.

In 2018, Lin starred in her first television series Battle Through the Heavens, a fantasy wuxia drama based on the novel of the same name. She also starred in Beautiful Reborn Flower, a romance melodrama based on the novel of the same name by Anni Baobei; and music-themed romance drama Cantabile Youth, based on the Japanese manga Nodame Cantabile.

In 2019, Lin starred as the female lead in the romance film Fall in Love at First Kiss, a remake of the Taiwanese series of the same name. She also reprised her role in the second installment of the film, The Mermaid.

Filmography

Film

Television series

Television show

Discography

Awards and nominations

References

1996 births
Actresses from Zhejiang
People from Huzhou
Living people
21st-century Chinese actresses
Chinese film actresses
Chinese television actresses